Qaragol may refer to:
Qaragöl, Azerbaijan
Qaragol, Kurdistan, Iran
Qaragol, Zanjan, Iran
Qaragol, Sulaimani, Iraq
Qaraghol, Iran
Qarah Gol, Khodabandeh, Iran

See also
 Karakol (disambiguation)